Kirsten Jensen (born 27 December 1952) is a Danish curler and curling coach.

At the national level, she is a two-time mixed champion (1991, 2011) and mixed doubles champion (2008).

Teams

Women's

Mixed

Mixed doubles

Record as a coach of national teams

Personal life
Kirsten is from famous family of Danish curlers. Her husband is Johannes Jensen - curler, coach and longtime (since 1987) president of Tårnby Curling Club; at 2021 he was inducted into the WCF Hall of Fame as "builder". Their daughters Angelina Jensen and Camilla Jensen are famous Danish curlers, national champions, World and European medallists. Kirsten, Johannes and Angelina as mixed team won 1991 Danish mixed championship.

References

External links
 

Living people
1952 births
Danish female curlers
Danish curling champions
Danish curling coaches
Place of birth missing (living people)